Yevgeny Viktorovich Vuchetich (–12 April 1974) (Evhen Viktorovych Vuchetych) was a prominent Soviet sculptor and artist. He is known for his heroic monuments, often of allegoric style, including The Motherland Calls, the largest sculpture in the world at the time.

Biography
Vuchetich was born in Yekaterinoslav, Russian Empire (now Dnipro, Ukraine), the son of Viktor Vuchetich (Vučetić), of Serbian descent, and Anna Andreevna Stewart, of Russian and of French descent.

He was a prominent representative of the Socialist Realism style and was awarded with the Lenin Prize in 1970, the Stalin Prize (1946, 1947, 1948, 1949, 1950), Order of Lenin (twice), Order of the Patriotic War (2nd degree), Hero of Socialist Labor (1967) and People's Artist of the USSR (1959).

Family 

One of his step-granddaughters is Israeli politician Ksenia Svetlova.

Works
Soviet War Memorial in Treptower Park, Berlin (1946–1949), overseen by a 13m tall monument of a Soviet soldier holding a German child, with a sword, over a broken swastika. This war memorial design was later used on coins and medals commemorating the end of fascist rule in 1945.
Nikolai Vatutin monument in Kyiv,  Ukraine (1948). This monument was dismantled on 9 February 2023.
Let Us Beat Swords into Plowshares in the United Nations garden (1957)
Let Us Beat Swords into Plowshares in front of the plant "Gazoapparat" in Volgograd.
A sculpture of Felix Dzerzhinsky (1958), colloquially known as "Iron Felix", used to be in Moscow at the Lubyanka Square.
The Motherland Calls! at Mamayev Kurgan (1963–1967)

See also

 List of Russian artists

References

1908 births
1974 deaths
Heroes of Socialist Labour
Lenin Prize winners
People's Artists of the USSR (visual arts)
Russian people of Serbian descent
Russian male sculptors
Socialist realist artists
Soviet sculptors
Soviet people of Serbian descent
Stalin Prize winners
Ukrainian people of Russian descent
Ukrainian people of Serbian descent
Ukrainian people of French descent
Ukrainian male sculptors
Ukrainian sculptors
20th-century sculptors

Russian people of French descent 
Soviet people of French descent